Guo Dongpo (born August 1937) is a Chinese politician who served as president of the China Council for the Promotion of International Trade from 1995 to 1997 and director of the Overseas Chinese Affairs Office from 1997 to 2003.

He was an alternate member of the 14th Central Committee of the Chinese Communist Party and a member of the 15th Central Committee of the Chinese Communist Party. He was a member of the 7th National Committee of the Chinese People's Political Consultative Conference and a member of the Standing Committee of the 8th and 10th Chinese People's Political Consultative Conference.

Biography
He secondary studied at the Yangzhou High School of Jiangsu Province. In 1958, he entered Beijing Institute of Foreign Trade (now University of International Business and Economics), majoring in international trade. He stayed and worked at the university after graduation.

Guo joined the Chinese Communist Party (CCP) in May 1960. Starting in 1972, he served in several posts in the China Council for the Promotion of International Trade, where he was eventually promoted to president in June 1995. He was appointed president of the Xinhua News Agency Macao Branch in 1990, concurrently serving as deputy director of the Macao Basic Law Drafting Committee. He became director of the Overseas Chinese Affairs Office in August 1997, serving in the post until his retirement in December 2002. In March 2003, he was chosen as chairperson of the Liaison with Hong Kong, Macao, Taiwan and Overseas Chinese Committee of the Chinese People's Political Consultative Conference.

References

1937 births
Living people
People from  Yangzhou
Beijing University of International Business and Economics alumni
Academic staff of Beijing University of International Business and Economics
People's Republic of China politicians from Jiangsu
Chinese Communist Party politicians from Jiangsu
Alternate members of the 14th Central Committee of the Chinese Communist Party
Members of the 15th Central Committee of the Chinese Communist Party
Members of the 7th Chinese People's Political Consultative Conference
Members of the Standing Committee of the 8th Chinese People's Political Consultative Conference
Members of the Standing Committee of the 10th Chinese People's Political Consultative Conference